William Edward Jackson III (born February 13, 1945) served with Greenpeace in its early years (1975–77), as crew member on the first anti-whaling expedition, and as cofounder of Greenpeace San Francisco (the first GP chapter after Vancouver, BC). A pioneer synthesizer player (Serge, Buchla, Moog), Jackson was aboard the Greenpeace V as part of the media campaign to demonstrate whale intelligence, and to disrupt Russian whaling. Jackson played a large modular synthesizer that had been brought onboard, broadcast through underwater speakers, with the intention of communicating with whales through synthesized whale song. He was one of six persons out of a rotating pool of 35 to remain aboard throughout the expedition. Bob Hunter, cofounder and first president of Greenpeace, credits Jackson with saving him from drowning at Triangle Island.

Following on the success of that voyage, Jackson opened the San Francisco office of Greenpeace. With the assistance of Fund for Animals (Cleveland Amory, Virginia Handley), and eco-filmmaker Stan Minasian, and commercial pilot Al Johnson. Jackson launched a grassroots media campaign, struggling from a South-of-Market condemned hotel to gain volunteers and donations, in preparation for the first anti-sealing expedition, and the follow-up whale expedition of 1976. (Three years after he left, the chapter was embroiled in a lawsuit with Vancouver over a million dollars and rights; the outcome being the formation of today’s Greenpeace International). These accounts and others are referenced in Robert Hunter's book, Rex Weyler’s Greenpeace (Rodale, 2004), the Hunter-Weyler collaboration To Save A Whale (Chronicle Books, 1978), and The Greenpeace Story (Dorling Kindersley, 1989).

Prefacing his Greenpeace years, in 1970 as a multimedia artist he won a scholarship to California Institute of the Arts, but allegedly lost it when he offended his mentor Allan Kaprow. He moved on to Serge Tcherepnin's CalArts synthesizer workshop, and co-founded electronic music groups Cellar M with Naut Humon, and 'TO' with experimental percussionist Z'EV. Later he performed with Ethership (Willard Van De Bogart, Lemon DeGeorge). Notably, he played synthesizer "whale music" with saxophonist Paul Winter aboard the GP-5, and at the "Save The Seas International Music Benefit", International Trade Center, Tokyo, 1977, with Z'EV.

In the 1980s Jackson became interviewer/program producer for Miss Wire Waist of KPFK's Sounds of Jamaica (L.A.); and published Jah Guide reggae culture magazine. He recorded, published and broadcast speeches on apartheid by Jesse Jackson, Michael Manley, and Bishop Desmond Tutu; and interviews with Steel Pulse, Burning Spear, Big Youth, Mutabaruka, Ras Michael and Peter Tosh. Meanwhile, he managed a 25-year career as a maritime seaman, union captain, and then fatherhood. In 2003 he authored the "reggae" novel Flight From Babylon (Infinity). His second novel and Greenpeace memoirs are forthcoming.

Bibliography
 Flight From Babylon: The Legend of Draxie Dread (2004)
 Once Upon A Greenpeace (2011)

References

Living people
People associated with Greenpeace
1945 births